Lieutenant-General Francis Humberston Mackenzie, 1st Baron Seaforth,  (9 June 1754 – 11 January 1815) was a British politician, soldier, and botanist. He was Chief of the Highland Clan Mackenzie, as which he raised the renowned 78th (Highlanders) Regiment of Foot.

Early life
Mackenzie was the second son of Major William Mackenzie (d. 12 March 1770), who was the son of the Hon. Alexander Mackenzie, and the grandson of Kenneth Mackenzie, 4th Earl of Seaforth. Francis's mother was Mary, the daughter and heiress of Matthew Humberston of Humberston, Lincolnshire.

On the death of his elder brother Colonel Thomas Frederick Mackenzie Humberston in 1783, Francis Mackenzie became the last male heir of the attainted Earls of Seaforth. When he was about twelve years of age, Francis contracted scarlet fever, which incurred the loss of his ability to hear and almost all of his ability to speak. As a consequence, he was known as MacCoinnich Bodhar (Deaf Mackenzie in Gaelic).

Political and military career

From 1784 to 1790, and again from 1794 to 1796, Seaforth was Member of Parliament for the County of Ross.

In 1787 he offered to raise a regiment on his own estates to be commanded by himself.  The government declined his patriotic offer but accepted his services in procuring recruits for the 74th and 75th. On 19 May 1790 he renewed his offer but the government again declined his services.  When war broke out in 1793 he offered for a third time and a letter of service was granted in his favour dated 7 March 1793 empowering him as Lieutenant-Colonel-Commandant to raise a Highland Battalion to be called 78th (Highlanders) Regiment of Foot.

He was appointed Lord Lieutenant of Ross-shire and was raised to the peerage of Great Britain as Lord Seaforth, Baron Mackenzie of Kintail in the County of Ross on 26 October 1797. In 1798 he was appointed Colonel of the Ross-shire Regiment of Militia.

Seaforth served as Governor of Barbados from 1800 to 1806, during which period he reformed slavery on the island, established a prohibition of the killing of slaves, and reduced official discrimination against free blacks. As Governor of Barbados, Seaforth appointed Thomas Moody, a mathematical expert from a prominent British family, to a direct commission in the Royal Engineers, which Moody entered as a lieutenant in 
1806. Seaforth was made a Lieutenant-General in 1808.

Avocational life
In 1794 Seaforth was elected a Fellow of the Royal Society for his contributions to botany. The genus Seaforthia was named after him. In 1795 he was elected a Fellow of the Royal Society of Edinburgh, also as a consequence of his contributions to botany: his proposers were Daniel Rutherford, Alexander Monro (secundus), and John Playfair. He was also a Fellow of the Linnean Society, and served as Extraordinary Director of the Highland Society.

In 1796, Mackenzie gave £1,000 to Sir Thomas Lawrence to assist with Lawrence's financial difficulties. Lawrence later painted a full-length portrait of Seaforth's daughter, Mary.

Lord Seaforth commissioned Benjamin West's painting "King Alexander III of Scotland being rescued from the fury of a stag by the intrepidity of Colin Fitzgerald".

Walter Scott said of him: 

Seaforth nearly recovered entirely the use of his tongue, but during the last two years of his life, which he spent mourning the deaths of his four sons, he rarely spoke.

Family

Mackenzie married, 1782, Mary Proby, daughter of The Very Rev Baptist Proby, 7th Dean of Lichfield and Mary Russel. Mary was the niece of John Proby, 1st Baron Carysfort and sister of Rev. Charles Proby.

Francis's four legitimate sons all predeceased him as predicted by the Brahan Seer. 
His children were:
William Frederick Mackenzie (died young)
George Leveson Boucherat Mackenzie (died young)
Hon. William Frederick Mackenzie (died 1814), MP for Ross-shire
Hon. Francis John Mackenzie, midshipman, RN (died unmarried 1813)
Hon. Mary Elizabeth Frederica Mackenzie, heiress to her father, (married first Admiral Sir Samuel Hood, married second Rt Hon James Alexander Stewart of Glasserton).
Frances Catherine Mackenzie, dsp
Caroline Elizabeth Mackenzie (accidentally killed unmarried)
Charlotte Elizabeth Mackenzie (died unmarried)
Augusta Anne Mackenzie (died unmarried in 1856) buried in Dean Cemetery
Helen Anne Mackenzie (married Joshua Henry Mackenzie, Lord Mackenzie) (buried in Greyfriars Kirkyard)

References

Sources 
 
 Sidney Lee (ed), Dictionary of National Biography (1891), London, Smith, Elder & Co

External links

Seaforth's Lewis by Finlay MacLeod

|-

1754 births
1815 deaths
Barons in the Peerage of the United Kingdom
Peers of Great Britain created by George III
Mackenzie, Francis Humberston
British MPs 1784–1790
British MPs 1790–1796
British Army generals
Governors of Barbados
Lord-Lieutenants of Ross-shire
Mackenzie, Francis Humberston
Deaf royalty and nobility
MacKenzie, Francis
Fellows of the Royal Society
British politicians with disabilities
Francis
Mackenzie, Francis Humberston
Marquesses in the Jacobite peerage
British deaf people